Dodrill is an unincorporated community in Calhoun County, West Virginia, United States.

The community was named after the Dodrill family.

References 

Unincorporated communities in West Virginia
Unincorporated communities in Calhoun County, West Virginia